Leka Mini Baridam is a Nigerian taekwondo practitioner who competes in the women's senior category. She won a bronze medal at the 2011 All-African Games in the 73 kg category.

Sports career 
Baridam competed in the 73 kg at the 2011 All-African Games held in Maputo, Mozambique and she won a bronze medal.

References 

Living people
2000 births
African Games bronze medalists for Nigeria
African Games medalists in taekwondo
Competitors at the 2011 All-Africa Games
Nigerian female taekwondo practitioners
21st-century Nigerian women